Major Theodor Quandt (22 June 18976 June 1940) was a World War I German flying ace credited with 15 aerial victories. He would return to his nation's service for World War II, being killed on 6 June 1940 during the Fall of France.

Birth and early military service

Theodor Quandt was born in Mollaud, Prussia on 22 June 1897.

He enlisted in the infantry on 4 August 1914, while he was still 17 years old. He later served as an artilleryman. He was a combatant in the Battle of Tannenberg on the Eastern Front. He was switched to the Western Front in early 1916. On 1 July, he began aerial service, training as a pilot. Once qualified, he was posted to Flieger-Abteilung (Artillerie) (Flier Detachment (Artillery) 270), an artillery direction unit, on 1 January 1917. He served with them until transferred to Jagdstaffel 36 (Fighter Squadron 36) on 1 April. Rather unusually, he did not undergo fighter training before making the switch.

World War I flying service

Quant began his victory roll with Jagdstaffel 36 as a balloon buster, setting a pair of observation balloons on fire on 21 May 1917. This string of wins ran until the eighth one, on 8 November 1917, the seventh having been over British aces Arthur Taylor and William Benger.

On 24 December 1917, Quandt was transferred to Jagdstaffel 53 as its commanding officer. After almost a ten month lapse, Quant resumed scoring on 27 August 1918 with a double victory. His eleventh triumph, on 1 September 1918, was over American ace John Donaldson. He then scored four more times in the next three days, and finished the war as a lieutenant.

World War II flying service

Quandt was killed in action while flying a Messerschmitt Bf 109 during the Fall of France in the beginning of World War II.

Sources of information

References

 Above the Lines: The Aces and Fighter Units of the German Air Service, Naval Air Service and Flanders Marine Corps, 1914–1918. Norman Franks, Frank W. Bailey, Russell Guest. Grub Street, 1993. , .

 Albatros Aces of World War 1: Part 1 of Albatros aces of World War I. Norman L. R. Franks. Osprey Publishing, 2000. , .

 Albatros Aces of World War 1: Part 2 of Albatros aces of World War I.  Norman L. R. Franks, Greg VanWyngarden. Osprey Publishing, 2007. , .

Further reading

 ACES OF JAGDGESCHWADER Nr III, Greg VanWyngarden. Osprey Publishing, 2016. 

1897 births
1940 deaths
German World War I flying aces
German World War II pilots
Luftwaffe personnel killed in World War II
People from East Prussia
German Army personnel of World War I
Aviators killed by being shot down